The siege of Kajiki was fought in 1549 the Shimazu clan besieged the castle of Kajiki in what is now Kagoshima prefecture, Japan. The siege succeeded and the castle was taken. The siege is notable for the first time "Portuguese derived" arquebuses were used in battle in Japan.

Shimazu Takahisa attacked the castle of Kajiki in Ōsumi Province, in southern Kyushu. Ijuin Tadaaki, a Shimazu vassal, used a gun provided by Tanegashima Tokitaka. Shimazu Takahisa earned the distinction of being the first Daimyō to use European firearms in battle.

Shimazu Takahisa proceeded to enlarge Shimazu holdings on the island of Kyushu during the following several years.

References 
Sources
↑ Samurai Commanders 1, Stgephen Turnbull pg.49

↑ Samurai Sourcebook, Stephen Turnbull pg.78

↑ Samurai Commanders 1, Stephen Turnbull pg.49

Battles of the Sengoku period
1549 in Japan
Shimazu clan
Sieges involving Japan
Conflicts in 1549